Sunisa Srangthaisong ( born 6 May 1988) is a Thai international footballer who plays as a defender.

International goals

References

External links 
 
 
 

1988 births
Living people
Women's association football defenders
Sunisa Srangthaisong
2015 FIFA Women's World Cup players
Sunisa Srangthaisong
Footballers at the 2006 Asian Games
Footballers at the 2010 Asian Games
Footballers at the 2014 Asian Games
Sunisa Srangthaisong
Sunisa Srangthaisong
Sunisa Srangthaisong
Southeast Asian Games medalists in football
Footballers at the 2018 Asian Games
Competitors at the 2007 Southeast Asian Games
Competitors at the 2017 Southeast Asian Games
2019 FIFA Women's World Cup players
Sunisa Srangthaisong
Competitors at the 2019 Southeast Asian Games
FIFA Century Club